Clive Brooke, Baron Brooke of Alverthorpe (born 21 June 1942) is a British trade unionist, and Labour Member of the House of Lords.

The son of John Brooke and Mary Colbeck, Brooke was educated in Thornes House School, Wakefield. From 1964 to 1982, he worked as Assistant Secretary of the Inland Revenue Staff Federation, from 1982 to 1988 as Deputy General Secretary and as General Secretary from 1988 to 1995. In 1996 Brooke became Joint General Secretary of Public Services Tax and Commerce Union and held this post until 1998. He was Member of the General Council of the Trades Union Congress (TUC) between 1989 and 1996 and between 1993 and 1996 of the TUC Executive Committee. Brooke is a Member of the Public and Commercial Services Union (PCS), the successor to the civil service union he led.

On 23 October 1997, he was created a life peer as Baron Brooke of Alverthorpe, of Alverthorpe in the County of West Yorkshire. He sits on the Labour benches. In the same year he became Trustee of the Institute for Public Policy Research. He has been a trustee and Council member of Community Service Volunteers (CSV) and is a trustee of Action on Addiction. He served as a non-executive director of NATS (formerly National Air Traffic Services) from 2001 until 2006. In 2020 he became the Patron of  Sugarwise.

Lord Brooke of Alverthorpe has been married to Lorna Hopkin Roberts since 1967.

Arms

References

Royal College of Arms October 2016

1942 births
Labour Party (UK) life peers
Life peers created by Elizabeth II
Living people
General secretaries of the Inland Revenue Staff Federation
Members of the General Council of the Trades Union Congress